The Bavarian Classic is a Group 3 flat horse race in Germany open to three-year-old thoroughbreds. It is run at Munich over a distance of 2,000 metres (about 1¼ miles), and it is scheduled to take place each year in early May.

History
The event was established in 1969, and the inaugural running was titled the Preis des Kaufhauses Hertie. It became known as the Grosser Hertie-Preis in 1970, and for a period its distance ranged from 1,850 to 2,200 metres. It was given Group 2 status in 1977, and from this point it was regularly contested over 2,200 metres.

The race was known as the Grosser Müller-Brot-Preis from 1997, and it was cut to 2,000 metres in 1998. It was downgraded to Group 3 level and renamed the Bavarian Classic in 2004. Prior to 2016 it was usually run in late May or early June, but is now regularly contested on 1 May.

Records

Winners

See also
 List of German flat horse races
 Recurring sporting events established in 1969  – this race is included under its former title, Grosser Hertie-Preis.

References
 Racing Post:

 galopp-sieger.de – Bavarian Classic.
 horseracingintfed.com – International Federation of Horseracing Authorities – Bavarian Classic (2011).
 pedigreequery.com – Grosser Müller-Brot Preis (Bavarian Classic) – München-Riem.

Flat horse races for three-year-olds
Horse races in Germany
1969 establishments in West Germany
Recurring sporting events established in 1969